The Paluh Hinai Bridge or Jambatan Paluh Hinai is the main bridge on Pahang River near Paluh Hinai, Pahang, Malaysia. It is located at Tun Razak Highway (Federal Route 12). The bridge was opened in 1983 along with the opening of the Tun Razak Highway and, as of 2013, was the longest bridge along the highway.

Bridges in Pahang